Lucas Serme (born 25 February 1992 in Créteil) is a professional squash player who represented France. He reached a career-high world ranking of World No. 32 in October 2018. He married Czech squash player Anna Klimundová, now known as Anna Serme.

References

External links 
 
 

1992 births
Living people
French male squash players
Sportspeople from Créteil